This list of human resource management associations includes notable professional associations that either serve the broad scope of human resource management or a narrow scope within the field. Professional HR associations "aim to keep members informed, interconnected, and employed" by offering "member directories, publications, discussion groups, awards, local chapters, vendor relations, government lobbying, and job boards".

Associations

References 

Human resource management associations
Human resource